The 2001 FA Women's Cup Final was the 31st final of the FA Women's Cup, England's primary cup competition for women's football teams. The final event was played between Arsenal and Fulham Ladies on 6 May 2001 at Selhurst Park in London. Angela Banks scored the winner A record 13,824 people attended the match.

Match

Summary

A tense match between Fulham and Arsenal ended with Angela Banks scoring the winning goal for Arsenal.

References

External links
 
 Report at WomensFACup.co.uk

Women's FA Cup finals
Arsenal W.F.C. matches
Cup
May 2001 sports events in the United Kingdom
2001 sports events in London